Chirio's blind snake (Afrotyphlops chirioi) is a species of snake in the family Typhlopidae.

References

Endemic fauna of the Central African Republic
chirioi
Reptiles described in 2019